Baressa is a comune (municipality) in the Province of Oristano in the Italian region Sardinia, located about  northwest of Cagliari and about  southeast of Oristano.

Baressa borders the following municipalities: Baradili, Gonnoscodina, Gonnosnò, Siddi, Simala, Turri, Ussaramanna.

References

Cities and towns in Sardinia